In computing, a hash table, also known as hash map, is a data structure that implements an associative array or dictionary. It is an abstract data type that maps keys to values. A hash table uses a hash function to compute an index, also called a hash code, into an array of buckets or slots, from which the desired value can be found. During lookup, the key is hashed and the resulting hash indicates where the corresponding value is stored.

Ideally, the hash function will assign each key to a unique bucket, but most hash table designs employ an imperfect hash function, which might cause hash collisions where the hash function generates the same index for more than one key. Such collisions are typically accommodated in some way.

In a well-dimensioned hash table, the average time complexity for each lookup is independent of the number of elements stored in the table. Many hash table designs also allow arbitrary insertions and deletions of key–value pairs, at amortized constant average cost per operation.

Hashing is an example of a space-time tradeoff. If memory is infinite, the entire key can be used directly as an index to locate its value with a single memory access. On the other hand, if infinite time is available, values can be stored without regard for their keys, and a binary search or linear search can be used to retrieve the element.

In many situations, hash tables turn out to be on average more efficient than search trees or any other table lookup structure. For this reason, they are widely used in many kinds of computer software, particularly for associative arrays, database indexing, caches, and sets.

History
The idea of hashing arose independently in different places. In January 1953, Hans Peter Luhn wrote an internal IBM memorandum that used hashing with chaining. Open addressing was later proposed by A. D. Linh building on Luhn's paper. Around the same time, Gene Amdahl, Elaine M. McGraw, Nathaniel Rochester, and Arthur Samuel of IBM Research implemented hashing for the IBM 701 assembler. Open addressing with linear probing is credited to Amdahl, although Ershov independently had the same idea. The term "open addressing" was coined by W. Wesley Peterson on his article which discusses the problem of search in large files.

The first published work on hashing with chaining is credited to Arnold Dumey, who discussed the idea of using remainder module a prime as a hash function. The word "hashing" was first published by an article by Robert Morris. A theoretical analysis of linear probing was submitted originally by Konheim and Weiss.

Overview 
An associative array stores a set of (key, value) pairs and allows insertion, deletion, and lookup (search), with the constraint of unique keys. In the hash table implementation of associative arrays, an array  of length  is partially filled with  elements, where . Under reasonable assumptions, hash tables have better time complexity bounds on search, delete, and insert operations in comparison to self-balancing binary search trees.

Hash tables are also commonly used to implement sets, by omitting the stored value for each key and merely tracking whether the key is present.

Load factor
A load factor  is a critical statistic of a hash table, and is defined as follows:

where
  is the number of entries occupied in the hash table.
  is the number of buckets.

The performance of the hash table deteriorates in relation to the load factor . Therefore a hash table is resized or rehashed if the load factor  approaches 1. A table is also resized if the load factor drops below . Acceptable figures of load factor  should range around 0.6 to 0.75.

Hash function

A perfect hash function can be created if all the keys are known ahead of time.

Integer universe assumption 
The schemes of hashing used in integer universe assumption include hashing by division, hashing by multiplication, universal hashing, dynamic perfect hashing, and static perfect hashing. However, hashing by division is the commonly used scheme.

Hashing by division 
The scheme in hashing by division is as follows:

Hashing by multiplication 
The scheme in hashing by multiplication is as follows:

Although any value  produces a hash function, Donald Knuth suggests using the golden ratio.

Choosing a hash function

Uniform distribution of the hash values is a fundamental requirement of a hash function. A non-uniform distribution increases the number of collisions and the cost of resolving them. Uniformity is sometimes difficult to ensure by design, but may be evaluated empirically using statistical tests, e.g., a Pearson's chi-squared test for discrete uniform distributions.
	
The distribution needs to be uniform only for table sizes that occur in the application. In particular, if one uses dynamic resizing with exact doubling and halving of the table size, then the hash function needs to be uniform only when the size is a power of two. Here the index can be computed as some range of bits of the hash function. On the other hand, some hashing algorithms prefer to have the size be a prime number.

For open addressing schemes, the hash function should also avoid clustering, the mapping of two or more keys to consecutive slots. Such clustering may cause the lookup cost to skyrocket, even if the load factor is low and collisions are infrequent. The popular multiplicative hash is claimed to have particularly poor clustering behavior.
	
K-independent hashing offers a way to prove a certain hash function does not have bad keysets for a given type of hashtable. A number of K-independence results are known for collision resolution schemes such as linear probing and cuckoo hashing. Since K-independence can prove a hash function works, one can then focus on finding the fastest possible such hash function.

Collision resolution

A search algorithm that uses hashing consists of two parts. The first part is computing a hash function which transforms the search key into an array index. The ideal case is such that no two search keys hashes to the same array index. However, this is not always the case and is impossible to guarantee for unseen given data. Hence the second part of the algorithm is collision resolution. The two common methods for collision resolution are separate chaining and open addressing.

Separate chaining

In separate chaining, the process involves building a linked list with key–value pair for each search array index. The collided items are chained together through a single linked list, which can be traversed to access the item with a unique search key. Collision resolution through chaining with linked list is a common method of implementation of hash tables. Let  and  be the hash table and the node respectively, the operation involves as follows:

 Chained-Hash-Insert(T, k)
   insert x at the head of linked list T[h(k)]
 
 Chained-Hash-Search(T, k)
   search for an element with key k in linked list T[h(k)]
 
 Chained-Hash-Delete(T, k)
   delete x from the linked list T[h(k)]

If the element is comparable either numerically or lexically, and inserted into the list by maintaining the total order, it results in faster termination of the unsuccessful searches.

Other data structures for separate chaining

In dynamic perfect hashing, two-level hash tables are used to reduce the look-up complexity to be a guaranteed  in the worst case. In this technique, the buckets of  entries are organized as perfect hash tables with  slots providing constant worst-case lookup time, and low amortized time for insertion. A study shows array based separate chaining to be 97% more performant when compared to the standard linked list method under heavy load.

Techniques such as using fusion tree for each buckets also result in constant time for all operations with high probability.

Caching and locality of reference 
The linked list of separate chaining implementation may not be cache-conscious due to spatial locality—locality of reference—when the nodes of the linked list are scattered across memory, thus the list traversal during insert and search may entail CPU cache inefficiencies.

In cache-conscious variants, a dynamic array found to be more cache-friendly is used in the place where a linked list or self-balancing binary search trees is usually deployed for collision resolution through separate chaining, since the contiguous allocation pattern of  the array could be exploited by hardware-cache prefetchers—such as translation lookaside buffer—resulting in reduced access time and memory consumption.

Open addressing

Open addressing is another collision resolution technique in which every entry record is stored in the bucket array itself, and the hash resolution is performed through probing. When a new entry has to be inserted, the buckets are examined, starting with the hashed-to slot and proceeding in some probe sequence, until an unoccupied slot is found. When searching for an entry, the buckets are scanned in the same sequence,  until either the target record is found, or an unused array slot is found, which indicates an unsuccessful search.

Well-known probe sequences include:
 Linear probing, in which the interval between probes is fixed (usually 1).
 Quadratic probing, in which the interval between probes is increased by adding the successive outputs of a quadratic polynomial to the value given by the original hash computation.
 Double hashing, in which the interval between probes is computed by a secondary hash function.

The performance of open addressing may be slower compared to separate chaining since the probe sequence increases when the load factor  approaches 1. The probing results in an infinite loop if the load factor reaches 1, in the case of a completely filled table. The average cost of linear probing depends on the hash function's ability to distribute the elements uniformly throughout the table to avoid clustering, since formation of clusters would result in increased search time.

Caching and locality of reference 
Since the slots are located in successive locations, linear probing could lead to better utilization of CPU cache due to locality of references resulting in reduced memory latency.

Other collision resolution techniques based on open addressing

Coalesced hashing

Coalesced hashing is a hybrid of both separate chaining and open addressing in which the buckets or nodes link within the table. The algorithm is ideally suited for fixed memory allocation. The collision in coalesced hashing is resolved by identifying the largest-indexed empty slot on the hash table, then the colliding value is inserted into that slot. The bucket is also linked to the inserted node's slot which contains its colliding hash address.

Cuckoo hashing

Cuckoo hashing is a form of open addressing collision resolution technique which guarantees  worst-case lookup complexity and constant amortized time for insertions. The collision is resolved through maintaining two hash tables, each having its own hashing function, and collided slot gets replaced with the given item, and the preoccupied element of the slot gets displaced into the other hash table. The process continues until every key has its own spot in the empty buckets of the tables; if the procedure enters into infinite loop—which is identified through maintaining a threshold loop counter—both hash tables get rehashed with newer hash functions and the procedure continues.

Hopscotch hashing

Hopscotch hashing is an open addressing based algorithm which combines the elements of cuckoo hashing, linear probing and chaining through the notion of a neighbourhood of buckets—the subsequent buckets around any given occupied bucket, also called a "virtual" bucket. The algorithm is designed to deliver better performance when the load factor of the hash table grows beyond 90%; it also provides high throughput in concurrent settings, thus well suited for implementing resizable concurrent hash table. The neighbourhood characteristic of hopscotch hashing guarantees a property that, the cost of finding the desired item from any given buckets within the neighbourhood is very close to the cost of finding it in the bucket itself; the algorithm attempts to be an item into its neighbourhood—with a possible cost involved in displacing other items.

Each bucket within the hash table includes an additional "hop-information"—an H-bit bit array for indicating the relative distance of the item which was originally hashed into the current virtual bucket within H-1 entries. Let  and  be the key to be inserted and bucket to which the key is hashed into respectively; several cases are involved in the insertion procedure such that the neighbourhood property of the algorithm is vowed: if  is empty, the element is inserted, and the leftmost bit of bitmap is set to 1; if not empty, linear probing is used for finding an empty slot in the table, the bitmap of the bucket gets updated followed by the insertion; if the empty slot is not within the range of the neighbourhood, i.e. H-1, subsequent swap and hop-info bit array manipulation of each bucket is performed in accordance with its neighbourhood invariant properties.

Robin Hood hashing
Robin hood hashing is an open addressing based collision resolution algorithm; the collisions are resolved through favouring the displacement of the element that is farthest—or longest probe sequence length (PSL)—from its "home location" i.e. the bucket to which the item was hashed into. Although robin hood hashing does not change the theoretical search cost, it significantly affects the variance of the distribution of the items on the buckets, i.e. dealing with cluster formation in the hash table. Each node within the hash table that uses robin hood hashing should be augmented to store an extra PSL value.
 If : the iteration goes into the next bucket without attempting an external probe.
 If : insert the item  into the bucket ; swap  with —let it be ; continue the probe from the st bucket to insert ; repeat the procedure until every element is inserted.

Dynamic resizing
Repeated insertions cause the number of entries in a hash table to grow, which consequently increases the load factor; to maintain the amortized  performance of the lookup and insertion operations, a hash table is dynamically resized and the items of the tables are rehashed into the buckets of the new hash table, since the items cannot be copied over as varying table sizes results in different hash value due to modulo operation. If a hash table becomes "too empty" after deleting some elements, resizing may be performed to avoid excessive memory usage.

Resizing by moving all entries
Generally, a new hash table with a size double that of the original hash table gets allocated privately and every item in the original hash table gets moved to the newly allocated one by computing the hash values of the items followed by the insertion operation. Rehashing is computationally expensive despite its simplicity.

Alternatives to all-at-once rehashing
Some hash table implementations, notably in real-time systems, cannot pay the price of enlarging the hash table all at once, because it may interrupt time-critical operations. If one cannot avoid dynamic resizing, a solution is to perform the resizing gradually to avoid storage blip—typically at 50% of new table's size—during rehashing and to avoid memory fragmentation that triggers heap compaction due to deallocation of large memory blocks caused by the old hash table. In such case, the rehashing operation is done incrementally through extending prior memory block allocated for the old hash table such that the buckets of the hash table remain unaltered.
 Clean  bucket.
 Clean  bucket.
 The command gets executed.

Linear hashing

Linear hashing is an implementation of the hash table which enables dynamic growths or shrinks of the table one bucket at a time.

Performance
The performance of a hash table is dependent on the hash function's ability in generating quasi-random numbers for entries in the hash table where ,  and  denotes the key, number of buckets and the hash function such that . If the hash function generates the same  for distinct keys, this results in collision, which is dealt with in a variety of ways. The constant time complexity of the operation in a hash table is presupposed on the condition that the hash function doesn't generate colliding indices; thus, the performance of the hash table is directly proportional to the chosen hash function's ability to disperse the indices. However, construction of such a hash function is practically infeasible, that being so, implementations depend on case-specific collision resolution techniques in achieving higher performance.

Applications

Associative arrays

Hash tables are commonly used to implement many types of in-memory tables. They are used to implement associative arrays.

Database indexing
Hash tables may also be used as disk-based data structures and database indices (such as in dbm) although B-trees are more popular in these applications.

Caches

Hash tables can be used to implement caches, auxiliary data tables that are used to speed up the access to data that is primarily stored in slower media. In this application, hash collisions can be handled by discarding one of the two colliding entries—usually erasing the old item that is currently stored in the table and overwriting it with the new item, so every item in the table has a unique hash value.

Sets

Hash tables can be used in the implementation of set data structure, which can store unique values without any particular order; set is typically used in testing the membership of a value in the collection, rather than element retrieval.

Transposition table

A transposition table to a complex Hash Table which stores information about each section that has been searched.

Implementations
Many programming languages provide hash table functionality, either as built-in associative arrays or as standard library modules. 

In JavaScript, every value except for 7 "primitive" data types is called an "object", which uses either integers, strings, or guaranteed-unique "symbol" primitive values as keys for a hash map. ECMAScript 6 also added Map and Set data structures.

C++11 includes unordered_map in its standard library for storing keys and values of arbitrary types.

Go's built-in map implements a hash table in the form of a type.

Java programming language includes the HashSet, HashMap, LinkedHashSet, and LinkedHashMap generic collections.

Python's built-in dict implements a hash table in the form of a type.

Ruby's built-in Hash uses the open addressing model from Ruby 2.4 onwards.

Rust programming language includes HashMap, HashSet as part of the Rust Standard Library.

See also

 Rabin–Karp string search algorithm
 Stable hashing
 Consistent hashing
 Extendible hashing
 Lazy deletion
 Pearson hashing
 PhotoDNA
 Search data structure
 Concurrent hash table
 Bloom filter
 Hash array mapped trie
 Distributed hash table

References

Further reading

External links

 NIST entry on hash tables
 Open Data Structures – Chapter 5 – Hash Tables, Pat Morin
 MIT's Introduction to Algorithms: Hashing 1 MIT OCW lecture Video
 MIT's Introduction to Algorithms: Hashing 2 MIT OCW lecture Video

Articles with example C code

Hash based data structures